Kjell Albrekt Oliver Holmström (July 8, 1916 – March 14, 1999) was a Swedish bobsledder who competed in the 1950s and in the 1960s. He won a bronze medal in the four-man event (tied with West Germany) at the 1953 FIBT World Championships in Garmisch-Partenkirchen.

Holmström also finished sixth in the four-man event and 15th in the two-man event at the 1952 Winter Olympics in Oslo.

Four years later he finished 13th in the four-man event at the 1956 Winter Olympics.

At the 1964 Winter Olympics he finished eleventh in the four-man event.

He was born in Skellefteå and died in Stockholm.

References
1952 bobsleigh two-man results
Bobsleigh four-man world championship medalists since 1930
Wallenchinsky, David. (1984). "Bobsled: Four-man". In The Complete Book of the Olympics: 1896-1980. New York: Penguin Books. p. 561.

1916 births
1999 deaths
Swedish male bobsledders
Olympic bobsledders of Sweden
Bobsledders at the 1952 Winter Olympics
Bobsledders at the 1956 Winter Olympics
Bobsledders at the 1964 Winter Olympics
People from Skellefteå Municipality
Sportspeople from Västerbotten County
20th-century Swedish people